Rafael Leandro Magalhães (born 6 February 1986) is a Brazilian professional footballer who plays as a striker for União Barbarense in the Campeonato Paulista Série A2.

Honours
Confiança
Campeonato Sergipano: 2015

References

External links
Profile at Football Database

1986 births
Living people
Brazilian footballers
Association football forwards
Esporte Clube Santo André players
São Bernardo Futebol Clube players
Sport Club Corinthians Alagoano players
Hammarby Fotboll players
Operário Ferroviário Esporte Clube players
Ljungskile SK players
Husqvarna FF players
Vila Nova Futebol Clube players
Clube Atlético Juventus players
Grêmio Catanduvense de Futebol players
KF Teuta Durrës players
Associação Desportiva Confiança players
União Recreativa dos Trabalhadores players
Esporte Clube Jacuipense players
União Agrícola Barbarense Futebol Clube players
Allsvenskan players
Kategoria Superiore players
Brazilian expatriate footballers
Brazilian expatriate sportspeople in Sweden
Brazilian expatriate sportspeople in Albania
Expatriate footballers in Sweden
Expatriate footballers in Albania